David Edward Gorrod (born 10 November 1975) is an English cricketer.  Gorrod is a right-handed batsman who bowls right-arm fast-medium.  He was born in Wimbledon, London.

Gorrod represented the Surrey Cricket Board in List A cricket.  His debut List A match came against Huntingdonshire in the 2001 Cheltenham & Gloucester Trophy.  From 2001 to 2002, he represented the Board in 4 List A matches, the last of which came against the Essex Cricket Board in the 2nd round of the 2003 Cheltenham & Gloucester Trophy which was held in 2002.  In his 4 List A matches, he took 4 wickets at a bowling average of 30.00, with best figures of 3/37.

He currently plays club cricket for Malden Wanderers Cricket Club in the Surrey Championship.

References

External links
David Gorrod at Cricinfo
David Gorrod at CricketArchive

1975 births
Living people
People from Wimbledon, London
Cricketers from Greater London
English cricketers
Surrey Cricket Board cricketers